CSS General M. Jeff Thompson was a cotton-clad  sidewheel ram of the Confederate Navy during the American Civil War.

The ship was selected in January 1862 by Captain James E. Montgomery to be part of his River Defense Fleet. At New Orleans on 25 January, Capt. Montgomery began to convert her into a cottonclad ram by placing a  oak sheath with a   iron covering on her bow, and by installing double pine bulkheads filled with compressed cotton bales.

Characteristics
In January 1862, the ship was chosen by Captain James E. Montgomery for Confederate service; it was assigned to the River Defense Fleet. Bulkheads stuffed with compressed cotton were also added to the ship, making it a cottonclad. 
The ship was powered by steam.  It was named after Confederate officer M. Jeff Thompson.

Service history

Battle of Plum Point Bend
On April 11, the modifications to General M. Jeff Thompson were completed, and the ship was sent to Fort Pillow in Tennessee, in order to guard the route to Memphis, Tennessee.  On May 10, the ship, as well as seven other Confederate ships, attacked the Union Mississippi Flotilla, which was composed of ironclads, resulting in the Battle of Plum Point Bend.  Some of the Confederate ships were able to successfully use their rams, but General M. Jeff Thompson could not get within ramming range, instead using its cannons.  On June 1, the Confederates abandoned Fort Pillow, and the ships retreated to Memphis.

Battle of Memphis
The Union flotilla pursued the Confederate vessels, reaching Memphis on June 6.  Montgomery, still commanding the Confederate fleet, did not believe that his ships had the ability to make it to Vicksburg due to fuel shortages, and decided against ordering the ships' scuttling.  Instead, the Confederates fought the naval Battle of Memphis.  During the fighting, Union cannon fire caught the General M. Jeff Thompson on fire.  After the ship ran aground, her crew left the vessel.  The fires reached the ship's naval magazine, which exploded, shattering the ship.  Some of General M. Jeff Thompson's remains were scattered on the shoreline, while other pieces of wreckage remained underwater.

References

Sources
 
 

Cottonclad rams of the Confederate States Navy
Maritime incidents in June 1862
Naval magazine explosions
Shipwrecks of the American Civil War
Shipwrecks of the Mississippi River